Heishibeihu is a volcanic field in the Kunlun Mountains of China.

The field lies in the western Kunlun Mountains. Volcanism took place in the region during the Tertiary and Quaternary, with Quaternary volcanism occurring north of the earlier volcanism. Regional active faults influence the location of volcanism, such as the Kangxiwar fault; some faults in the area are still active and caused earthquakes like one on the 26 June 2020. The volcanic field geologically belongs to the Songpan-Ganzi Terrane.

Eruptions commenced about 9.23 million years ago according to potassium-argon dating; thermoluminescence dating has yielded an age of 67,000 years for the most recent eruptions and Heishibeihu is considered to be the most recently active volcano in the Tibetan Plateau. Seismic tomography has identified mantle upwelling below the volcanic field, which is linked to the subduction of the Indian Plate.

Volcanic fields in the area include Kangxiwar, Dahongliutan, Quanshuigou and Heishibeihu in the south and north Pulu, east Pulu and Ashikule volcanic field in the south. They feature mainly lava flows forming terraces and platforms, with craters and pyroclastics uncommon. Latite bearing olivine is the most common volcanic rock and other rocks include leucite, phonolithic tephrite, trachybasalt and trachyte. Paleogene rocks and Quaternary river sediments underlie volcanic rocks, which were emplaced over lake sediments.

References

Sources 

 
 
 
 
 
 
 
 

Volcanoes of China